Gondrecourt-le-Château is a commune in the Meuse department in Grand Est in north-eastern France.

On January 1, 1973 (prefectoral order dated December 1, 1972), the communes of Luméville-en-Ornois and Touraille-sous-Bois merged with and became part of it.

Notable people
 Louis Jacquinot, former Minister of the Marine (Navy) in 1944
 Fernand Braudel, historian born in Luméville-en-Ornois 1902
 Fernand Fleuret, writer and poet, born in Gondrecout April 1883
 André Droitcourt, former Deputy of the Meuse from 1993 to 1997

See also
Communes of the Meuse department

(Gondrecourt-le-Château)

References

Gondrecourtlechateau
Duchy of Bar